The mayor of Baguio is the chief executive of the government of Baguio, a highly urbanized city territorially located in Benguet and the regional center of the Cordillera Administrative Region, Philippines. The mayor leads the city's departments in executing ordinances and delivering public services and holds office at the Baguio City Hall. The mayor, like all local government executives, has a term of office of three years, but has a maximum electoral tenure of three consecutive terms. He is assisted by the City Vice Mayor. In case of death, resignation or incapacity, the vice mayor becomes the mayor.

History 
The Inaugural holder of the office is E.W. Reynolds having been appointed by the governor general. He served from September 1, 1909, to February 5, 1910. He was succeeded by E.A. Eckman, concurrently serving as lieutenant governor of the sub-province of Benguet. He would serve until 1913 when he was appointed as governor of Mountain Province. In February 1920, Eusebius Halsema was appointed as city mayor, as well as city engineer and district engineer of Benguet. He is best known for building the mountain trail to Bontoc, which was renamed in his honor, now known as Halsema Highway. He also undertook major infrastructure developments in the city, such as widening and paving roads, the construction of the Loakan airfield and the Asin Hydropower Plant.  He would be longest serving and the last American mayor of Baguio, serving for more than 17 years.

On May 31, 1937, upon the resignation of Mayor Halsema, District Engineer of Mountain Province Sergio Bayan was appointed as mayor by President Manuel Quezon. He holds distinction as the first Filipino mayor of Baguio. Baguio saw its first-ever female mayor, Virginia Oteyza-de Guia, albeit in an acting capacity. She also holds the distinction as the first elected female councilor and first (and to date the only) female vice mayor of Baguio.

Baguio held its first elections in 1960, which saw its first elected mayor, Luis Lardizabal. Since the elections in 1960 which saw the first elected mayor of Baguio up to the present time, only two were appointed as mayor of Baguio, Mayors Bueno and Paraan. During the martial law years, President Ferdinand Marcos appointed Gen. Ernesto Bueno upon the expiration of Mayor Lardizabal's term in 1979. When the suspension on elections was lifted, Mayor Bueno ran and won in the subsequent 1980 elections. He would serve as mayor until his death in March 1986 due to a vehicular accident.  Mayor Bueno's death, which coincided with the upheavals brought about by the People Power Revolution saw Col. Francisco Paraan appointed as mayor by President Cory Aquino.

In the 1988 elections that followed, Ramon Labo, a well known faith healer during that time, won the race. He was, however, subsequently disqualified due to his citizenship. Vice Mayor Bugnosen was elevated to city mayor following Labo's disqualification. They would later face-off in the subsequent 1992 elections which would see Labo winning the mayoralty a second time around. Labo would again be disqualified in the same year, elevating Vice Mayor Mauricio Domogan to the mayoral post. Domogan would go on to become the longest serving mayor of the city, serving for almost 18 years, from 1992 to 2001 and again from 2010 to 2019.

In 2004, Councilor Braulio Yaranon, who was a retired judge and former city vice mayor won the mayoral post, beating incumbent mayor Bernardo Vergara. Mayor Yaranon would face suspension in 2006 due to issues stemming from a complaint filed by a private parking company operating in the city. Vice Mayor Reinaldo Bautista Jr. would take his oath as acting city mayor. The two would later go head to head in the 2007 elections, where Bautista would defeat Yaranon for the post.

The incumbent mayor is Benjamin Magalong, a retired police general well known for heading the Mamasapano board of inquiry in 2015.

List 
This is a list of the city mayors of Baguio.

Notes on the mayors
 Died in office.
 Subsequently disqualified in 1989
 Elevated to city mayor
 Subsequently disqualified in 1992
 Suspended for one year
 Served as acting mayor until 2006. Won the subsequent 2007 elections.

Notes on the vice mayors
 Died in office.
 Elevated to city vice mayor
 Elevated to city vice mayor in 1992. Won subsequent vice mayoral elections in 1995 and 1998.
 Elevated to city vice mayor. Subsequently won as vice mayor in 2016.

Timeline of elected city mayors (1960 to present)

Elections 
 1960 Baguio local elections
1963 Baguio local elections
1967 Baguio local elections
1971 Baguio local elections
1980 Baguio local elections
1988 Baguio local elections
1992 Baguio local elections
1995 Baguio local elections
1998 Baguio local elections
2001 Baguio local elections
2004 Baguio local elections
2007 Baguio local elections
 2010 Baguio local elections
 2013 Baguio local elections
 2016 Baguio local elections
 2019 Baguio local elections
 2022 Baguio local elections

Vice Mayor
The Vice Mayor is the second-highest official of the city The vice mayor is elected via popular vote; although most mayoral candidates have running mates, the vice mayor is elected separately from the mayor. This can result in the mayor and the vice mayor coming from different political parties.

The Vice Mayor is the presiding officer of the 14-man Baguio City Council, and he can only vote in case of a tiebreaker. If the mayor dies or is either suspended or removed from office, the vice mayor assumes the functions as city mayor and serve out his remaining term until the next election.

In case that the vice mayor dies while in office or is either removed or suspended, his duties will be carried out by the No.1 councilor, which is the councilor who garnered the most votes in the immediately preceding election.

The incumbent Vice Mayor is Faustino A. Olowan as of June 30, 2019.

Notes

References

Local government in Baguio
Baguio